"You Gotta Be a Football Hero" is a song written by Al Sherman, Buddy Fields and Al Lewis in 1933. It is one of the most widely recorded and performed American football anthems of all time.

Recording artists
Fred Waring and his Pennsylvanians
Ben Bernie (charted 1933)
Tuxedo Junction
Crew Cuts
Ralph Flanagan Orchestra
Dick Haymes
Notre Dame Glee Club
Soul Touchers Band & Chorus

The 1935 Popeye cartoon
In 1935, "You Gotta Be a Football Hero" was the subject of a Popeye the Sailor cartoon.  The film was produced by the Fleischer Studios and distributed by Adolph Zukor. Popeye, Olive Oyl, Bluto and J. Wellington Wimpy were each featured in the cartoon.  The short film was directed by Dave Fleischer and produced by Max Fleischer.

Plotline Summary:  Popeye and Bluto play professional football.

The animators credited (and uncredited) include:  Willard Bowsky, Nick Tafuri, George Germantetti, Harold Walker, Bill Sturm and Orestes Calpini.  The film was originally produced in black and white but was colorized in the late 1980s.  It was released produced in the United States of America.

Uses in other motion pictures
The Longest Yard (1974)
The Cat in the Hat (2003)
Revenge of the Nerds

Literary sources
 Sherman, Robert B. Walt's Time: from before to beyond, Santa Clarita: Camphor Tree Publishers, 1998.

References

Songs written by Al Sherman
Songs written by Al Lewis (lyricist)
North American anthems
Sporting songs
Fight songs
Football songs and chants
Songs written for films
1933 songs